Donald Macleod (born 24 November 1940) is a Scottish theologian.

Early life
Born in 1940 in Ness, Lewis, Macleod was educated at the University of Glasgow and the Free Church College before being ordained as a minister of the Free Church of Scotland in 1964.

Career
Choosing an academic career, he was appointed as professor of systematic theology at the Free Church College in 1978, a position he held for some 33 years. 

In 1996, he was considering leaving the Free Church to join the Church of Scotland, and following a new career as a writer and journalist, but remained in post and in 1999 was elected as principal of the Free Church College. He retired from that post in 2010, and as a professor in 2011. In that year, a Festschrift was published in his honour, The People's Theologian: Writings in Honour of Donald Macleod. This included contributions from Richard Gaffin, Derek Thomas, and Carl Trueman.

Allegations
In 1996, Macleod was cleared of allegations that he had sexually assaulted four women between 1985 and 1991. The Sheriff court found that "the women had all lied in the witness box to further the ends of Professor Macleod's enemies in the Free Church of Scotland." People who believed Macleod should be put on trial by the General Assembly then formed the Free Church Defence Association and ultimately a new denomination, the Free Church of Scotland (Continuing). However, Johnston McKay later noted that although on the surface the split was about Macleod, in his view it was about theology, since Macleod belonged to the more "modernising" wing of the Free Church.

Works 
 The Spirit of Promise (Christian Focus, 1986)
 Rome and Canterbury: A View from Geneva (Christian Focus, 1989)
 Shared Life (Christian Focus, 1994)
 Behold Your God (Christian Focus, 1995)
 A Faith to Live By (Christian Focus, 1998)
 The Person of Christ (IVP, 1998)
 Jesus is Lord: Christology Yesterday and Today (Christian Focus, 2000)
 From Glory to Golgotha (Christian Focus, 2002)
 Priorities for the Church (Christian Focus, 2003)
 The Living Past (Acair, 2006)
 Christ Crucified: Understanding the Atonement (IVP, 2014)
 Compel Them to Come in (Christian Focus, 2020)
 Therefore the Truth I Speak: Scottish Theology 1500-1700 (Christian Focus, 2020)

References

1940 births
Living people
People from the Isle of Lewis
20th-century Ministers of the Free Church of Scotland
Alumni of the University of Glasgow
Scottish Calvinist and Reformed theologians
Presidents of Calvinist and Reformed seminaries
20th-century Calvinist and Reformed theologians
21st-century Calvinist and Reformed theologians
21st-century Ministers of the Free Church of Scotland